Ploiești, formerly spelled Ploești, is a city and county seat in Prahova County, Romania.

According to the 2021 census, Ploiești is the tenth most populous city in the country.

The city grew beginning with the 17th century on an estate bought by Michael the Brave from the local landlords, gradually taking the place of the nearby Wallachian fairs of Târgșor, Gherghița and Bucov. Its evolution was accelerated by heavy industrialisation, with the world's first industrial scale petroleum refinery being opened in 1856–1857. Following massive exploitation of the oil deposits in the area, Ploiești earned the nickname of "the Capital of Black Gold". In the present, its economic activity is still based on oil processing, the city having three large refineries and other industries related to this branch.

Ploiești is also an important transport hub, linking the capital with the regions of Transylvania and Moldavia. The city has direct access to the Prahova Valley, one of the most important alpine tourism areas in Romania.

History

Though likely settled much earlier, Ploiești first appeared in documents in the 16th century during the reign of Michael the Brave, the Prince of Wallachia. It flourished as a center for trade and handicraft-manufacturing in the 17th and 18th centuries. The road connecting Ploiești to Brașov was opened in 1864, and the railway arrived in 1882. Many schools and hospitals date from this period.

In the mid-19th century the region of Ploiești became one of the world's leading oil-extraction and -refinery sites. The Mehedințeanu brothers opened the world's first large refinery in Ploiești in 1856–1857. History also remembers the city as the site of the self-styled Republic of Ploiești, a short-lived 1870 revolt against the Romanian monarchy.

During World War I, Ploiești's oil production made it a target when the Central Powers invaded Romania in 1916, a British Army operation commanded by Colonel John Griffiths destroying production and sabotaging much of the infrastructure of the industry.

World War II

Although badly damaged after the November 1940 earthquake, the city functioned as a significant source of oil for Nazi Germany during much of World War II. The Allies made Ploiești a target of the oil campaign of World War II and bombed it repeatedly,
such as during the HALPRO (Halverson Project, June 1942) and Operation Tidal Wave (1 August 1943) at a great loss, without producing any significant delay in operation or production. Soviet Red Army troops captured Ploiești on 24 August 1944.

Following the war, the new Communist régime of Romania nationalised the oil industry, which had largely been privately owned, and made massive investments in the oil- and petroleum-industry in a bid to modernise the country and to repair the war damage.

Demographics

The population of Ploiești went from 56,460, as indicated by the December 1912 census, up to 252,715 in January 1992. However, since the fall of Communism, the city's population continues to gently fall due to both emigration and a declining birth rate. At the 2002 census, the population was reduced to 232,527. As of the 2011 census data, Ploiești has a population of 197,542, while the proposed Ploiești metropolitan area would number 266,457 persons.

The majority of the inhabitants are ethnic Romanians (90.64%), but a Roma minority (2.4%) is present in several neighborhoods of the city—predominantly Bereasca, Mimiu and Radu de la Afumați. For 6.65% of the population, the ethnicity is unknown. Most of the people living in Ploiești declare themselves as Orthodox Christians (90.7%).

Historical trends
The population of Ploiești grew at a rapid pace because of the intense economic development of the area. In 1810, during the years of the Ottoman occupation there were only around 2,024 inhabitants in the present-day city. In 1837 this grew to 3,000 inhabitants, 11 years after the Union in 1859 the population was 26,458 while in 1884 the number stood at 32,000. During the early 20th century, the population of Ploiești grew even more, due to the expansion of the petrol industry. Even though the city was bombed during World War II, the population of Ploiești recovered, numbering 95,632 inhabitants in January 1948.

Economy

After the Romanian Revolution of 1989, Ploiești experienced rapid economic loss. It is a strong industrial center, focused especially on the oil production and refining industry. Although oil production in the region is declining steadily, there is still a thriving processing industry with four operating oil refineries, linked by pipelines to Bucharest, the Black Sea port of Constanța and the Danube port of Giurgiu. Ploiești also has a long history as a textile manufacturing center.

The city has become a hub of foreign investment. Companies such as OMV-Petrom, Lukoil, Shell Gas, Timken, Yazaki, Coca-Cola, Efes Pilsener, British American Tobacco, Federal-Mogul, and Interbrew have operations there, and retailers like Carrefour, Metro, Selgros, Kaufland, Billa, Bricostore, Lidl, Obi, Auchan, Profi, Mega Image have found in Ploiești a continuously growing market, but the pay rate for employees is lower than expected. There are four McDonald's restaurants in Ploiești and three KFCs.

The German retailer Tengelmann built a depot in Ploiești to support a €200 million regional expansion plan. With its Interex (ro) operation, the French independent retailer Intermarché intends to become a distribution leader in the Balkans. In Romania the first Interex store was opened in June 2002 in Ploiești. The Interex depot and facilities were bought by Penny Market XXL in 2014.

Unilever has a detergent plant in Ploiești. By transferring their food production to Ploiești, the company will concentrate all its activities in Romania at the same location. At the beginning of March 2006, Unilever announced they would invest money to build one production center in Romania, and the construction of the new food plant is part of this plan.

In 1950, as a milestone in the development of the petroleum, hydrocarbon processing, and petrochemical industries, the Engineering and Design Institute for Oil Refineries and Petrochemical Plants, SC IPIP SA, a Romanian company with a large range of capabilities and experience, was established at Ploiești.

In Ploiești there are four local television channels: Ploiești TV, Valea Prahovei TV, Wyll TV and Prahova TV.

Transportation

Ploiești is situated on the A3 motorway, the main route to Romania's northern and western provinces and the Western EU. Henri Coandă International Airport is  distant, and the ski resorts of the Prahova Valley can be reached in an hour's drive. Ploiești is the second most important railway center in the country after Bucharest, linking Bucharest with Transylvania and Moldavia. 

The city's public transportation system is run by TCE Ploiești and includes an extensive network of buses, trolleybuses and trams/streetcars. Ploiești's distinctive yellow bus fleet is one of the most modern in Southeastern Europe, providing connections to all areas within the city, for a daily average of 150,000 passengers. Around 5,300 vehicles transit Ploiești each day, with East and West ring belts diverting much traffic. The municipal vehicle fleet comprised 256 buses, 36 trams and 25 trolleybuses carrying about 70 millions passengers annually.

Culture

Ploiești is home to the Ploiești Philharmonic Orchestra—one of the top-rated philharmonic orchestras in Romania, a prominent football club, FC Petrolul Ploiești, women handball club CSM Ploiești from Liga Națională and basketball team CSU Asesoft.

There are many cultural and architectural monuments, including the Cultural Palace; the Clock Museum, featuring a collection of clocks and watches gathered by Nicolae Simache; the Oil Museum; the Ploiești Art Museum, donated by the Quintus family; and the Hagi Prodan Museum, dating to 1785: the property of a merchant named Ivan Hagi Prodan, it contains elements of old Romanian architecture and for a short time after World War I it hosted the first museum in Ploiești, "Prahova Museum".
In August 2011, Ploiești hosted the Golden Carpathian European Film & Fair and Goran Bregovic concert.

Several prominent writers have been affiliated with the city, including Ion Luca Caragiale, Constantin Dobrogeanu-Gherea, Ioan A. Bassarabescu, Nichita Stănescu, Geo Bogza, Radu Tudoran, composer Paul Constantinescu and philosopher Petre P. Negulescu. Three graduates of the "Sfinții Petru și Pavel" High school were presidents of the Romanian Academy: Andrei Rădulescu, Mihai Drăgănescu and Eugen Simion.

Education
The first school in Ploiești was opened in 1777 and by 1832 several other elementary schools are opened. Secondary education is first offered in 1864.

Ploiești is home to the following universities and colleges: 
Oil & Gas University, founded in 1948
George Barițiu University, founded in 2002

Important secondary schools in Ploiești are:

Ion Luca Caragiale National College
Jean Monnet National College
Alexandru Ioan Cuza National College
Nichita Stănescu National College
Virgil Madgearu Economic College 
Spiru Haret High School
Lazăr Edeleanu Technical College

Constantin Brâncoveanu Military School
Toma N. Socolescu High School
Victor Slăvescu Technologic, Administration and Service High School

Geology
The Mio-Pliocene Zone in the Ploiești region has been exploited for hydrocarbons and coal since the 19th Century. The zone extends from the flysch on the north to the Moesian Platform on the south. The zone is marked by alternating deposits of Clay, Marl, Shale and Sand, conglomerate, Salt and Limestone. Structural traps and stratigraphic traps are formed from Salt Diapirism which gave rise to anticline folds and faulting. There are four major alignments of the anticlines, all parallel to the Carpathian Range. Pliocene sands are the main oil and gas producers, in particular the Meotian (60%) and Dacian (29%), followed by the Miocene Sarmatian (5%) but some oil exists in Miocene Helvetian and Oligocene sandstones. Major producing structures include Moreni-Gura Ocniței, Băicoi-Țintea and Boldești.

Geography

Ploiești lies in the center of Muntenia, in the central-northern part of the Wallachian Plain. It lies close to the capital city Bucharest and it had close connections with the capital city throughout the centuries. Ploiești lies at the 25°E meridian and the 44°55’N parallel (north). There exist two rivers in the proximity of the city: the Prahova River, on the south-west, briefly passes through the city through the Brazi settlement and the Teleajen River passes through the Blejoi, Bucov, Berceni villages. The city lies on Dâmbu River, which springs from the hills around the Băicoi town. Nowadays the Dâmbu River doesn't have a high flow rate.

Nearest towns

Climate
The climate is similar to that of the nation's capital, Bucharest. According to the Köppen climate classification, the city falls within the temperate humid continental climate(Dfa) of the hot summer type. On average, around 17 days are very cold, 26 cold, 99 warm and 30 tropical, while the rest have a moderate temperature.

Precipitations range between  registered in 1901 and  registered in 1930. Throughout the year, there are on average 104 days with rain, 26 with snow, 112 with clear skies, 131 with clouds and 122 with no sunshine.

Landscape and flora

The Teleajen River passes through the city while the Dâmbu River passes through the north-eastern neighbourhoods.

The vegetation of Ploiești used to be characterised by a plain forest, made up predominantly of pedunculate oak trees (Quercus robur). Other varieties of oak trees such as the sessile oak (Quercus petraea) also existed. Remnants of the old forest still exist and some trees are currently protected, such as two old oak trees in Ghighiu, on the southern periphery of the city.

In current times the vegetation is typical of urban settlements, made up of ornamental plants, plantations of chestnuts, aspen and black locust. Parks and other green areas are limited: the main boulevard area, the park next to the Sala Sporturilor, the park from the northern part of the city, the "Mihai Viteazul" park and another park next to the Bucov barrier.

Around the city one can also observe several endangered trees, which are protected by law. These include the giant redwood (Sequoiadendron giganteum) from the garden of the "Paul Constantinescu" museum. There also exist trees that have adapted to the local climate, such as figs. In some neighbourhoods more fruit trees and flowers are currently being planted.

Politics

The Ploiești Town Council, elected in the 2020 local elections, is made up of 27 councillors, with the following party composition:

There exist approximatively 88,104 flats that are located in 21,172 buildings. 93% of the households have access to clean water, 90% have access to the sewage network, 98% have access to electricity and 78% are connected to the district heating system.

Metropolitan area

The metropolitan area of Ploiești comprises 13 satellite towns. The area will become an important transit for two Pan-European motorway and rail corridors. The central administration of the area will coordinate the communication and transport networks, technological development and the reduction of the carbon footprint.

Twin towns – sister cities

Ploiești is twinned with:

 Berat, Albania

 Harbin, China
 Hîncești, Moldova
 Lefkada, Greece
 Maracaibo, Venezuela
 Marousi, Greece
 Oral, Kazakhstan
 Osijek, Croatia
 Radom, Poland
 Tulsa, United States

Natives

Academia: Liviu Librescu, Cristian Pârvulescu, Nicolae Simache
Architecture: Toma T. Socolescu
Arts, Theater, and Film: Geta Brătescu, Fory Etterle, Christian Magdu, Gabriel Popa (painter), Ruxandra Popa (model), Stefan Ramniceanu, Traian Trestioreanu
Literature: Paul Constantinescu, Lazăr Șăineanu, Nichita Stănescu 
Military: Ilie Crețulescu, Constantin Stoicescu, Ioannis Velissariou
Music: Andreea Bălan, Sonny Flame, Ionel Gherea, Wanlov the Kubolor, Nico, George Nicolescu, Florin Cezar Ouatu, Edgar Bischoff
Politics: Roberta Anastase, Petre Bejan, Mircea Coșea, Alexandru Dobrogeanu-Gherea, Ștefan Gheorghiu (trade unionist), Take Ionescu, Corneliu Mănescu, Istrate Micescu, Petre P. Negulescu, Remus Opriș, Dan Ioan Popescu, Sever Voinescu
Science: Mihai Ioan Botez, Roxana Geambasu, Basarab Nicolescu, Ion N. Petrovici
Sports: Octavian Belu, Tamara Costache, Alexandru Dedu, Adrian Diaconu, Leonard Doroftei, Laurențiu Toma

Gallery

See also
Petrochemical industry in Romania

Notes and references
 Sources provide differing estimates regarding Romanian production:
1942: The Axis Oil Position in Europe, November 1942 by the Hartley Committee estimated that "Romanian oil fields" contributed 33% of Axis supplies.<ref name=CasablancaPapersMinutes>{{cite book |last=US Secretary |date=January 1943 |title=Casablanca Conference: Papers and Minutes of Meetings |location=Dwight D. Eisenhower Presidential Library; COMBINED CHIEFS OF STAFF: Conference proceedings, 1941–1945; Box 1 |pages=40–43,88,256 |publisher=Office of the Combined Chiefs of Staff |quote=Brehon Somervell[inside front cover] … DECLASSIFIED … 10/29/73 … U.S. SECRET … BRITISH MOST SECRET … COPY NO. 32[inside back cover]}}</ref>
1944: "Ploiești, thirty-five miles from Bucharest, supplied one-third of all the oil fuel Germany required for war purposes.''"
1999: The fragile, concentrated Bucharest facilities provided "60% of Germany's crude oil supply"

External links
 Website of the town hall of Ploiești 
 RepublicaPloiești.net is a site specializing in architectural history of the City of Ploiești. It contains numerous photographs of the city taken between the beginning of the twentieth and 1945.
Tramway in Ploiești
 Map of Ploiești with route planning, points of interest, public transport

 
Cities in Romania
Capitals of Romanian counties
Populated places in Prahova County
Localities in Muntenia
Populated places established in 1596
1596 establishments in Europe
Oil campaign of World War II
16th-century establishments in Romania